Castore has been borne by at least three ships of the Italian Navy and may refer to:

 , a minelayer launched in 1888 and discarded in 1925.
 , a  launched in 1936 and sunk in 1943.
 , a  launched in 1956 and discarded in 1983. 

Italian Navy ship names